The 1968–69 Auburn Tigers men's basketball team represented Auburn University in the 1968–69 college basketball season. The team's head coach was Bill Lynn, who was in his sixth season at Auburn. The team played their home games at Auburn Sports Arena and Memorial Coliseum in Auburn, Alabama. They finished the season 15–10, 10–8 in SEC play.

References

Auburn Tigers men's basketball seasons
Auburn
Auburn Tigers
Auburn Tigers